Lewis County is a county in the U.S. state of West Virginia. As of the 2020 census, the population was 17,033. Its county seat is Weston. The county was formed in 1816 from Harrison County.

Geography

In 1863, West Virginia's counties were divided into civil townships, with the intention of encouraging local government.  This proved impractical in the heavily rural state, and in 1872 the townships were converted into magisterial districts.  Lewis County was initially divided into five townships: Battelle, Jane Lew, Lincoln, Sheridan, and Willey.  Between 1870 and 1880, these were renamed "Collins Settlement", "Court House", "Freemans Creek", "Hackers Creek", and "Skin Creek".  In the 1990s, Collins Settlement and Court House Districts were consolidated into one district, known as "Courthouse-Collins Settlement"; Hackers Creek and Skin Creek were also consolidated, forming "Hackers Creek-Skin Creek".

Major highways
 Interstate 79
 U.S. Highway 19
 U.S. Highway 48
 U.S. Highway 33/119
 West Virginia Route 4

Adjacent counties
Harrison County (north)
Upshur County (east)
Webster County (south)
Braxton County (southwest)
Gilmer County (west)
Doddridge County (northwest)

Demographics

2020 census 
As of the 2020 census, there were 17,033 people and 6,662 households residing in the county. There were 8,204 housing units in Lewis County. The racial makeup of the city was 94.5% White, 0.4% African American, 0.3% Asian, 0.1% Native American, 0.3% from other races, and 3.9% from two or more races. Hispanics or Latinos of any race were 1.1% of the population.

There were 26,143 households, of which  48.6% were married couples living together,  24.7% had a female householder with no spouse present,  20.8% had a male householder with no spouse present. The average household and family size was 3.13. The median age in the city was 43.6 years with 21.2% of the population was under 18. The median income for a household in the city was $45,345 and the poverty rate was 17.2%.

2010 census
As of the 2010 United States census, there were 16,372 people, 6,863 households, and 4,570 families living in the county. The racial makeup of the county was 97.9% white, 0.5% black or African American, 0.3% Asian, 0.2% American Indian, 0.1% from other races, and 1.0% from two or more races. Those of Hispanic or Latino origin made up 0.6% of the population. In terms of ancestry, 17.5% were American, 15.0% were German, 9.9% were Irish, and 7.2% were English.

Of the 6,863 households, 28.1% had children under the age of 18 living with them, 50.9% were married couples living together, 10.9% had a female householder with no husband present, 33.4% were non-families, and 28.5% of all households were made up of individuals. The average household size was 2.35 and the average family size was 2.84. The median age was 43.4 years.

The median income for a household in the county was $33,293 and the median income for a family was $42,281. Males had a median income of $31,950 versus $25,945 for females. The per capita income for the county was $18,240. About 13.6% of families and 19.6% of the population were below the poverty line, including 25.3% of those under age 18 and 12.9% of those age 65 or over.

2000 census
As of the census of 2000, there were 16,919 people, 6,946 households, and 4,806 families living in the county. The population density was 44 people per square mile (17/km2). There were 7,944 housing units at an average density of 21 per square mile (8/km2). The racial makeup of the county was 98.59% White, 0.13% Black or African American, 0.20% Native American, 0.29% Asian, 0.08% from other races, and 0.70% from two or more races. 0.50% of the population were Hispanic or Latino of any race.

There were 6,946 households, out of which 28.60% had children under the age of 18 living with them, 54.60% were married couples living together, 10.50% had a female householder with no husband present, and 30.80% were non-families. 26.90% of all households were made up of individuals, and 13.00% had someone living alone who was 65 years of age or older. The average household size was 2.40 and the average family size was 2.88.

In the county, the population was spread out, with 22.10% under the age of 18, 7.70% from 18 to 24, 28.00% from 25 to 44, 25.90% from 45 to 64, and 16.40% who were 65 years of age or older. The median age was 40 years. For every 100 females there were 94.20 males. For every 100 females age 18 and over, there were 91.40 males.

The median income for a household in the county was $27,066, and the median income for a family was $32,431. Males had a median income of $27,906 versus $18,733 for females. The per capita income for the county was $13,933. 19.90% of the population and 16.30% of families were below the poverty line. 27.00% of those under the age of 18 and 11.20% of those 65 and older were living below the poverty line.

Politics

Communities

City
Weston (county seat)

Town
Jane Lew

Magisterial districts
Courthouse-Collins Settlement
Freemans Creek
Hackers Creek-Skin Creek

Unincorporated communities

Aberdeen
Alkires Mills
Alum Bridge
Arnold
Aspinall
Bablin
Bealls Mills
Ben Dale
Bennett
Berlin
Brownsville
Butchersville
Camden
Churchville
Copley
Cox Town
Crawford
Emmart
Freemansburg
Gaston
Georgetown
Homewood
Horner
Ireland
Jackson Mill
Jacksonville
Kitsonville
Lightburn
McGuire Park
Orlando
Pickle Street
Roanoke
Turnertown
Walkersville
Valley Chapel
Vadis

See also
 National Register of Historic Places listings in Lewis County, West Virginia
 Stonewall Jackson Lake
 Stonewall Resort State Park
 Lewis County Schools

Footnotes

References

 
1816 establishments in Virginia
Populated places established in 1816
Counties of Appalachia